Apoorva Sagodharargal is a 1949 Indian Tamil-language action film directed by Acharya. The film which was adapted from Alexandre Dumas' 1844 novella The Corsican Brothers stars M. K. Radha and P. Bhanumathi, with Nagendra Rao and Suryaprabha playing supporting roles. It revolves around the two lookalike brothers who were separated during childhood by their cruel uncle who murdered his parents, rest of the film shows how two brothers join together in avenging the death of their parents.

Apoorva Sagodharargal was simultaneously produced in Tamil, Telugu and Hindi languages by Gemini Studios. The Telugu version Apoorva Sahodarulu was directed by C. Pullayya, and the Hindi version Nishan by S. S. Vasan.

Plot
Mahendra Bhoopathi and Marthandan are rival kings. When Bhoopathi's wife gives birth to conjoined twins, Dr. Nanjappa separates them skillfully. In a surprise attack, Marthandan and his men set fire to Bhoopathi's fort thinking that the entire Bhoopathi clan perishes. But the good doctor has taken the babies to the safety of his house. And thereafter the elder twin Vijayan grows up in the city, while the younger twin Vikraman is brought up in the forest by the loyal Marudhu. When they are 25 years old, the doctor sends for them and introduces them to each other and makes them aware of their history. The twins swear to avenge the dastardly killing of their father and restore the glory of their kingdom. Meanwhile, Vijayan saves the beautiful Kanchana from the aging yet lust-filled Marthandan and his men. Vijayan and Kanchana fall in love in due course. Problems arise between the brothers in the forest, as Vikraman too falls for Kanchana. And being the younger of the conjoined twins, Vikraman aches with frustrating feelings of physical desire whenever Vijayan and Kanchana are together. Not wanting to be the cause for the brothers turning against each other and in order to enable them to reach their avowed objective without further distraction, Kanchana leaves Vijayan in the forest, only to fall straight into the clutches of Marthandan. The rescue of Kanchana, and Marthandan getting his retribution forms the rest of the exciting tale.

Cast 

Cast according to the opening credits of the film and the songbook:

 P. Bhanumathi as Kanchana
 M. K. Radha as Vijayasimhan, Vikramasimhan
 Nagendra Rao as Marthandan
 Narayana Rao as Atappakkaran
 G. Pattu as Doctor Nanjappa
 V. P. S. Mani as Jambu
 D. Balasubramanian as Mahendra Bhoopathi
 Suryaprabha as Maragatham
 Lakshmiprabha as Neelaveni
 Venkumamba as Rajeswari Devi

 Krishna Bai as Doctor's Sister
 Shyam Sunder as Doctor's Relative
 G. V. Sharma as Shop Servant
 Stunt Somu as Maruthappa
 J. S. Casshyap as Rajasekharar
 Ramakrishna Rao as Servant
 Velayutham as Mayanti
 Vijaya Rao, Balaram, Anand,T. S. B. Rao, Sampathkumar as Soldiers
 Gemini Boys and Girls

Production
Apoorva Sagodharargal was adapted from Alexandra Duma's novel The Corsican Brothers. Gregory Ratoff adapted the film and Douglas Fairbanks Jr played the dual role of the conjoined twins Lucien and Mario Franchi. The film became successful which inspired Vasan to adapt the film in Tamil. T. G. Raghavachari alias Acharya lawyer turned film maker was selected to direct the film. M. K. Radha was selected to play the lead characters with Bhanumathi playing the lead actress. For the negative character, Vasan approached P. U. Chinnappa who refused fearing his image with Kannada actor Nagendra Rao being finalised for the role. "Stunt" Somu who did the stunt choreography appeared in the role of Marudhu, close associate of Bhoopathi. This film was often considered an unofficial sequel to Chandralekha.

Soundtrack
The music was composed by Rajeswara Rao, M. D. Parthasarathy and R. Vaidyanathan and lyrics were written by Kothamangalam Subbu and V. Seetharaman. The song "Laddu Laddu" sung by Bhanumathi was well received. A duet meant for the Hindi version was composed on the piano by Rajeswara Rao, and Vasan liked it so much he wanted it for the Tamil version too. This song was added after the shoot was over. Malayalam lyrics  written by P Baskaran

Remakes
Table of Apoorva Sagodharargal and its other versions:

Release and reception 

Apoorva Sagodharargal was released on 21 October 1949. The film was a major success both at the box-office and with the critics. Dhananjayan praised M. K. Radha's acting as "finest and best in his career" and appreciated director Acharya for "bringing out the best performance from everyone and presenting an entertaining and engaging film". Randor Guy of The Hindu wrote that the film "is remembered for the excellent performances of Bhanumathi and Nagendra Rao, and for the music". The film was remade in Telugu as Apoorva Sahodarulu, with Radha reprising the character. It was also remade in Hindi as Nishan with Ranjan. Bhanumathi was the lead actress for all the three versions.

Legacy 
The film introduced the concept of identical twins and their feelings and eventually became a trendsetter for similar themes. Later, the 1999 film Vaali, starring Ajithkumar also had a similar concept.

References

Bibliography

External links 
 

1940s Tamil-language films
1949 films
Films based on The Corsican Brothers
Films scored by S. Rajeswara Rao
Films with screenplays by Kothamangalam Subbu
Gemini Studios films
Indian black-and-white films
Twins in Indian films